Business class is a travel class available on many commercial airlines and rail lines, known by brand names which vary, by airline or rail company. In the airline industry, it was originally intended as an intermediate level of service between economy class and first class, but many airlines now offer business class as the highest level of service, having eliminated first-class seating. Business class is distinguished from other travel classes by the quality of seating, food, drinks, ground service and other amenities. In commercial aviation, full business class is usually denoted 'J' or 'C' with schedule flexibility, but can be many other letters depending on circumstances.

Airlines

History
Airlines began separating full-fare and discounted economy-class passengers in the late 1970s. In 1976, KLM introduced a Full Fare Facilities (FFF) service for its full fare economy-class passengers, which allowed them to sit at the front of the economy cabin immediately behind first class, and this concept was quickly copied by several other airlines including Air Canada. Both United Airlines and Trans World Airlines experimented with a similar three-class concept in 1978, but abandoned it due to negative reactions from discount economy-class travelers who felt that amenities were being taken away from them. United also cited the difficulty of tracking which passengers should be seated in which section of the economy cabin on connecting flights. American Airlines also began separating full-fare economy passengers from discounted economy passengers in 1978, and offered open middle seats for full-fare passengers.

Around this time, there was speculation in the airline industry that supersonic aircraft would corner the market for the highest-paying premium passengers, and that a three-class market would emerge consisting of supersonic first class and subsonic business and economy classes. In 1977, El Al announced plans to reconfigure its aircraft with a small first-class cabin and larger business-class cabin on the assumption that most transatlantic first-class passengers would shift their business to the Concorde.

British Airways introduced "Club World", a separate premium cabin with numerous amenities, in October 1978 under CEO Colin Marshall as a means of further distinguishing full-fare business travelers from tourists flying on discounted fares. Pan Am announced that it would introduce "Clipper Class" in July 1978, and both Air France and Pan Am introduced business class in November 1978. Qantas claims to have launched the world's first Business Class in 1979.

On November 1, 1981, Scandinavian Airlines System introduced EuroClass with a separate cabin, dedicated check-in counters and lounges for full-fare passengers. Simultaneously, first class disappeared from their European fleet.

Domestic and regional

Australia and New Zealand
Both Qantas and Virgin Australia offer business class on their domestic networks as well as on trans-Tasman flights to New Zealand. Flights between Perth and Sydney typically feature lie-flat seats, with deep recline cradle seats on other routes.

On the other hand, Air New Zealand does not offer business class on its domestic network. Business Class is available on flights between New Zealand, Australia and the Pacific Islands when operated by Boeing 777 and Boeing 787 family aircraft, both of which have lie-flat seats.

North America

Canada
On short-haul flights Air Canada offers recliner seats, which are similar to what is offered on regional business class in the United States. However, on some high-capacity routes, such as Vancouver–Toronto, Air Canada utilizes its long-haul fleet, such as the Boeing 777, Boeing 787, Boeing 767, and the Airbus A330. On flights using internationally configured aircraft such as these, the business-class product is a lie-flat product. However, on discount carriers, such as Air Transat, business class is "euro-style", an economy-class seat with a blocked middle seat for added comfort.

With the introduction of their Boeing 787’s on select domestic and international routes, WestJet Airlines offers 16 lay-flat business seats on each of their 787-9’s.

United States
American Airlines and Delta Air Lines both exclusively use fully lie-flat Business Class seats with direct aisle access on their widebody aircraft. United Airlines is in the process of retrofitting their older lie-flat seats to a new design with aisle access for all passengers and increased privacy. A multiple course meal is served on china after takeoff, and depending on the flight length a chilled snack or light meal will be served before landing. International Business Class passengers have access to priority check-in and security, along with lounge access. United and American both also offer premium lounges with enhanced food service in their hubs for these passengers.

Select routes between the East and West coasts are deemed "premium transcontinental" and offer a comparable experience to long haul international Business Class. However, it is uncommon for all seats to have direct aisle access. American uses a dedicated sub-fleet of 3-cabin A321T planes with 20 lie-flat Flagship Business seats in a 2-2 configuration for these flights. JetBlue also has a sub-fleet of A321s featuring their Mint Business Class, which alternates between a 2-2 lie flat seats and 1-1 suites with a closing door. United and Delta use a combination of wide and narrow body aircraft for these routes, with a variety of lie-flat seat designs.

Nearly all other flights in the US (as well as to Canada, Central America, and the Caribbean) on American, United, Delta, and Alaska use 2-cabin narrowbody aircraft. The forward cabin is marketed as "First Class" on domestic routes but regardless uses a Business Class fare basis. These fares include a larger "recliner" seat, priority check-in/security/boarding, and increased service. Only Alaska Airlines allows lounge access for customers in "First Class" without further international travel. Both alcoholic and non-alcoholic beverages are included, and are served in glassware or ceramic mugs. Meal service is highly variable depending on the airline, departure time, and route. Flights between hub airports during daytime hours are usually catered with a full warm meal regardless of the flight time. Regional jets do not have ovens, and all entrees are served chilled. At the very least, a flight attendant will pass around a basket containing premium snacks.

Europe
European carriers generally offer a business class consisting of enhanced economy seating with better service. There may be a curtain to separate business from economy class, based on demand, but the seats are in the same cabin. Some airlines such as Air France and Lufthansa use convertible seats that seat three people across in economy, or adjust with a lever to become two seats with a half seat length between them for business-class use.

Business class has started to disappear from some short/medium haul routes, to be replaced with full fare economy and discount economy (KLM and SAS). On these routes, the seats are the same for all passengers, only the flexibility of the ticket and the food and beverage service differs. On shorter routes (typically less than one hour) many airlines have removed business class entirely (e.g. BMI on many routes) and offer only one class of service. British Airways used to offer "Business UK" on their domestic system, offering the same service as economy class, with the addition of expedited check-in, baggage reclaim, lounge access and priority boarding. In flight, until January 11, 2017, drink, tea or coffee and a snack were served to all customers, with a hot breakfast on flights prior to 9.29am.

Discount carriers

Most low-cost carriers, such as Ryanair and EasyJet in Europe, Tigerair in Australia, Southwest Airlines in the United States, and even some national carriers such as Aer Lingus and Air New Zealand on their domestic and regional networks do not offer any premium classes of service. Some, however, have options above a standard coach seat:

AirAsia charges a premium for passengers to sit in front of the aircraft or the exit seats which also offer more legroom as well as board first (these are called Hot Seats).
On their domestic and trans-Tasman networks, Air New Zealand has Space + seats available complimentary for Koru Club elite members and for a small charge at check-in for others. Other than a few more inches of legroom the seats are identical to normal economy seats.
JetBlue offers Even More Space (the first 9 rows on the A320 and the bulkhead and emergency row on the E-190) for between $20 and $90 extra per segment. “Even More Space” includes priority boarding and priority security screening but no other benefits.
Spirit Airlines has Big Front Seats in the first row of all their aircraft. The seats were part of Spirit's former First Class offering, Spirit Plus, but now offer no benefits other than bigger seat pitch and a 2 by 2, rather than 3 by 3 arrangement.

Long haul

Business class is a much more significant upgrade from economy class for long-haul flights, in contrast to a regional or domestic flight where business class offers few relative advantages over economy class. The innovations in business-class seating, incorporating features previously only found in first class (see below), has narrowed the comfort and amenities gap with traditional first-class seats. These advances and added features to business class, as well as the late 2000s recession, have caused some airlines to remove or not install first-class seating in their aircraft (as first-class seats are usually double the price of business class but can take up more than twice the room) which leaves business class as the most expensive seats on such planes, while other airlines have reintroduced first-class sections as suites to stay upmarket over contemporary business class.

As with first class, all alcoholic beverages are complimentary and meals are of higher quality than economy class. Economy-class passengers are usually not permitted in the business-class cabin though first-class passengers are generally allowed to cross the curtain between business and first class.

Seating
Long-haul business-class seats are substantially different from economy-class seats, and many airlines have installed "lie-flat" seats into business class, whereas previously seats with such a recline were only available in international first class. There are essentially three types of long-haul business-class seats today. These are listed in ascending order of perceived "quality".

Cradle/recliner seats are seats with around 150-160 degrees of recline and substantially more leg room compared to the economy section. Although many airlines have upgraded their long-haul business-class cabins to angled lie-flat or fully flat seats, cradle/recliner seats are still common in business class on shorter routes.
Angled lie-flat seats recline 170 degrees (or slightly less) to provide a flat sleeping surface, but are not parallel to the floor of the aircraft when reclined, making them less comfortable than a bed. These seats first appeared on Northwest, Continental, JAL, Qantas and several other airlines in 2002 and 2003.
Fully flat seats recline into a flat sleeping surface which is parallel to the floor. Many airlines offer such seats in international first class but retain inferior seating in business class to differentiate the two products and fares. British Airways, which introduced flat beds in first class in 1995, was among the first airlines to introduce fully flat business-class seats with its Club World product in 1999.
Herringbone seating, in which seats are positioned at an angle to the direction of travel, is used in some widebody cabins to allow direct aisle access for each seat and to allow a large number of fully flat seats to occupy a small cabin space. The concept was first developed by Virgin Atlantic for its Upper Class cabin and has since been used by Delta, Cathay Pacific, Air Canada and other airlines.
Cabin seat, These seats are designed to give the business-class traveler the most privacy they can attain while in flight. These seats are typically positioned in a 1–2–1 arrangement on a wide-body jet. On each side of the seat is a privacy panel about four feet in height. Aircraft such as these offer the best ergonomic comfort on long-haul business-class flights. These were first introduced on US Airways.

Menus
While flying on a long-haul business-class flight, airlines such as Swiss, Lufthansa, SAS Scandinavian Airlines, and many others offer in-flight gourmet meals with a choice of entree. Upon seating in their seats, business-class passengers are presented with a choice of champagne, orange juice, or water (called pre-flight service), with a 3-5 course meal (typically including a salad, soup, entree (typically up to 3 choices), and a choice of dessert) to follow during the flight. Depending on the time of arrival, the flight may offer either a breakfast with a variety of choices or a light snack approximately 90 minutes prior to landing. Some airlines, such as Singapore Airlines, allow travelers to request specific meals not on the regular menu prior to the flight. The alcoholic beverage choices for business-class cabins are generous, with airlines offering different premium wines, and an assortment of beers and liqueurs.

Branding

The exact name for business class may vary between operators.
Bold text indicates airlines for which business class is the highest class of service offered.

Trains

Business class is the highest class of service in China high-speed rail, while first class and second class are the more affordable options. Business class passengers have access to a pre-departure lounge if available. Train seats of business class are arranged in 1-1 or 2-1 configuration with fully enclosed seats. Free meals, unlimited snacks, and beverages are provided for the business class passengers throughout the journey.

Select Amtrak trains in the United States offer a Business Class service. On Acela trains, Business Class is the primary class of service, and does not include any additional benefits onboard. On other routes, Business Class includes a refundable fare, and seating in a reserved area. Depending on the specific route, lounge access, wider seats with legrests, newspapers, or complimentary non-alcoholic beverages may be included.

Until June 2009, Via Rail in Canada premium-class service was called "Via 1", on short-range routes oriented towards business travel. The premium service on the transcontinental route (The Canadian) is called "Silver & Blue". In June 2009, "Via 1" was renamed "Business Class" and "Silver & Blue" (The Canadian) and "Easterly" (The Ocean) were renamed "Sleeper Touring Class" and "Totem" (The Skeena) was renamed "Touring Class".

Eurostar also offers business-class accommodation on their rail services – named "Business Premier", the seats are similar to the premium economy "Standard Premier" offering (wider seats with more legroom and greater recline compared to economy "standard class") but include faster check-in, boarding and a full meal service, among other features. Chiltern Railways offers a business zone on selected services.

Queensland Rail in Australia also offers business class on its Electric Tilt Train.

Austrian federal railway service ÖBB also offers a business class in their high-speed Railjet trains.

See also

 Aircraft cabin
 Airline seat
 Economy class
 Hypermobility (travel)
 First class
 IATA class codes
 Premium economy

References

External links 

 Qantas History including business class history
 Business Class Community with pictures
 https://www.executivetraveller.com/did-qantas-invent-business-class

Airline tickets
Passenger rail transport
Travel classes